Eugene McHale is a former Gaelic footballer who played at senior level for the Mayo county team. He also played for Knockmore, his home team, and won five Championship medals.

During his playing career he was one of the most recognisable footballers in the province of Connacht. He scored a goal for Mayo against Kerry in the semi-final of the 1981 All-Ireland Senior Football Championship.

He moved to Cliffoney, County Sligo, in 1980 and has lived there ever since. He served as a Guard in near by Grange until his retirement, and is a columnist with the Sligo Weekender.

McHale has also refereed matches and managed teams. In 2001, he made history when he became the first person from outside the parish to be appointed manager of the Easkey senior team.

References

Year of birth missing (living people)
Living people
Gaelic football managers
Gaelic football referees
Garda Síochána officers
Irish columnists
Mayo inter-county Gaelic footballers
Sligo Gaelic footballers